Eleanor Roosevelt (1884–1962) was an American politician who served as First Lady of the United States

Eleanor Roosevelt may also refer to:

Eleanor Butler Roosevelt (1888–1960), philanthropist, and wife of Theodore Roosevelt Jr.
Eleanor Roosevelt Seagraves (born 1927), American librarian, educator, historian, and editor

Geography
 Eleanor Roosevelt (Hato Rey), a borough of San Juan, Puerto Rico
 Eleanor Roosevelt National Historic Site, an historic site at Val-Kill in Hyde Park, New York

See also
 Eleanor Roosevelt High School (disambiguation)
 Roosevelt Institute